College City is a census-designated place in Colusa County, California. Its ZIP code is 95912, and its area code is 530. Its population was 290 at the 2010 census.

History
The College City post office was established in 1873. Pierce Christian College located to the town on land willed to the college by Andrew Pierce in 1875; but it subsequently left in 1896, and its facilities were taken over by the local high school district (see https://www.hmdb.org/m.asp?m=41810).  Currently, there is no college in College City.

Demographics

The 2010 United States Census reported that College City had a population of 290. The racial makeup of College City was 207 (71.4%) White, 0 (0.0%) African American, 5 (1.7%) Native American, 1 (0.3%) Asian, 0 (0.0%) Pacific Islander, 51 (17.6%) from other races, and 26 (9.0%) from two or more races. Hispanic or Latino of any race were 134 persons (46.2%).

The Census reported that 290 people (100% of the population) lived in households, 0 (0%) lived in non-institutionalized group quarters, and 0 (0%) were institutionalized.

There were 92 households, out of which 44 (47.8%) had children under the age of 18 living in them, 57 (62.0%) were opposite-sex married couples living together, 13 (14.1%) had a female householder with no husband present, 9 (9.8%) had a male householder with no wife present.  There were 3 (3.3%) unmarried opposite-sex partnerships, and 1 (1.1%) same-sex married couples or partnerships. 13 households (14.1%) were made up of individuals, and 7 (7.6%) had someone living alone who was 65 years of age or older. The average household size was 3.15.  There were 79 families (85.9% of all households); the average family size was 3.41.

The population was spread out, with 84 people (29.0%) under the age of 18, 24 people (8.3%) aged 18 to 24, 69 people (23.8%) aged 25 to 44, 74 people (25.5%) aged 45 to 64, and 39 people (13.4%) who were 65 years of age or older.  The median age was 36.0 years. For every 100 females, there were 113.2 males.  For every 100 females age 18 and over, there were 110.2 males.

The homeowner vacancy rate was 1.5%; the rental vacancy rate was 9.7%.  193 people (66.6% of the population) lived in owner-occupied housing units and 97 people (33.4%) lived in rental housing units.

Politics

References

Census-designated places in Colusa County, California
Census-designated places in California